Khlong Phutsa railway station, is a railway station in Bang Krasan Subdistrict, Bang Pa-in District, Phra Nakhon Si Ayutthaya. It is owned by the State Railway of Thailand and is served by the Northern Line and the Northeastern Line.

Train services 
 Ordinary No. 201/202 Bangkok- Phitsanulok- Bangkok
 Ordinary No. 207/208 Bangkok- Nakhon Sawan- Bangkok
 Ordinary No. 209/210 Bangkok- Ban Takhli- Bangkok
 Ordinary No. 211/212 Bangkok- Taphan Hin- Bangkok
 Ordinary No. 233/234 Bangkok- Surin- Bangkok
 Commuter No. 301/302 Bangkok- Lop Buri- Bangkok 
 Commuter No. 303/304 Bangkok- Lop Buri- Bangkok 
 Commuter No.  313/314 Bangkok- Ban Phachi Junction- Bangkok 
 Commuter No.  317/318 Bangkok- Lop Buri- Bangkok 
 Commuter No. 339/340  Bangkok- Kaeng Khoi Junction- Bangkok 
 Commuter No. 341/342 Bangkok- Kaeng Khoi Junction- Bangkok

References
 
 

Railway stations in Thailand